Lakepoint State Park is a public recreation area located on the far north side of the city of Eufaula. The state park encompasses  on the western shore of Lake Eufala (Walter F. George Lake), a  impoundment of the Chattahoochee River. The park adjoins Eufaula National Wildlife Refuge and is managed by the Alabama Department of Conservation and Natural Resources.

History
A campground and day-use facilities were added to the site in 1974.

An 18-hole golf course, which had been constructed in 1972, was closed at the end of November 2015 in response to the statewide parks budgeting crisis which saw the closing or curtailment of services at several Alabama state parks. In announcing the shutdown, state parks director Gregory M. Lein said an attempt had been made to find a concessionaire to take charge of golf course operations but that no takers had come forward.

Activities and amenities
Park facilities include a convention center, 101-room lodge, 192-campground sites, and a complex of lakeside cottages and fishermen's cabins. The grounds also include a marina, swimming pools, hiking trails, and picnicking areas.

References

External links
Lakepoint State Park Alabama Department of Conservation and Natural Resources

State parks of Alabama
Protected areas of Barbour County, Alabama